Apostolos Kaklamanis (born 7 September 1936) is a Greek politician and member of the Greek Parliament for the Panhellenic Socialist Movement (PASOK) for the Athens B constituency.

He has been elected as a PASOK MP in all the general elections since 1974.

He speaks English.

He has held the following government posts:

Minister of Employment (2 terms)
Minister for National Education and Religious Affairs (2 terms)
Minister for Justice
Minister for Research and Technology
Minister for Health and Social Solidarity
Deputy Minister to the Presidency

He was Speaker of the Hellenic Parliament from 22 October 1993 to 19 March 2004.

External links 
Personal homepage

|-

|-

|-

1936 births
Greek MPs 1974–1977
Greek MPs 1977–1981
Greek MPs 1981–1985
Greek MPs 1985–1989
Greek MPs 1989 (June–November)
Greek MPs 1989–1990
Greek MPs 1990–1993
Greek MPs 1993–1996
Greek MPs 1996–2000
Greek MPs 2000–2004
Greek MPs 2004–2007
Greek MPs 2007–2009
Greek MPs 2009–2012
Greek MPs 2012 (May)
Greek MPs 2012–2014
Living people
PASOK politicians
People from Lefkada
20th-century Greek lawyers
Speakers of the Hellenic Parliament
Ministers of National Education and Religious Affairs of Greece
Justice ministers of Greece
Health ministers of Greece
Social affairs ministers
Labour ministers of Greece
Science ministers